East Riffa Club is a Bahraini professional football club based in Riffa, Bahrain. They play in Bahraini Premier League, the top division of Bahraini football.

Achievements

Football

Bahraini Premier League: 1
 1994.

Bahraini Second Division League: 1
 2014.

Bahraini King's Cup: 3
 1999 , 2000 , 2014.

Bahraini FA Cup: 1
 2019.

Bahraini Super Cup: 1
 2014.

Managerial history
 Julio Peixoto
 Steve Darby (1979)
 Miloš Hrstić (1995–97)
 Vjeran Simunic (1998–99)
 Miloš Hrstić (2004–05)
 Dragan Talajić (2006–07)
 Senad Kreso (2011–12)
 Džemal Hadžiabdić (2012–13)
 Davor Berber (2013–15)
 Pedro Gómez Carmona (2018–19)

References

External links
  Official Site